Walking the Edge is a 1985 crime film and action film directed by Norbert Meisel, written by Curt Allen and starring Robert Forster, Nancy Kwan, Joe Spinell, A Martinez, James McIntire, Wayne Woodson, Luis Contreras.

Plot
A criminal gang led by Brusstar (Joe Spinell) enters a home with the intention of killing a man. A housewife, Christine (Nancy Kwan), survives the hit that kills her husband and young son. Shocked, she discovers that her upstanding citizen of a husband (Phil H. Fravel) was a drug dealer. She decides to take revenge on the criminal gang that has murdered her husband and son.

A down on his luck L.A. taxi driver and numbers runner, Jason Walk (Robert Forster) unwittingly becomes involved and helps her in her quest to survive and take revenge on the people who murdered her family.

Cast
 Robert Forster as Jason Walk
 Nancy Kwan as Christine Holloway
 Joe Spinell as Brusstar
 A Martinez as Tony
 James McIntire as Jimmy
 Wayne Woodson as McKee
 Doug Toby as Danny Holloway
 Phil H. Fravel as Jerry Holloway
 Luis Contreras as Jesus
 Terrence Beasor as Bob, The Gambler
 Bernard Erhard as Fat Man
 Jim Fitzpatrick as Fat Man's Bodyguard (as James Fitzpatrick)
 Ivy Bethune as Mrs. Johnson
 Jacqueline Giroux as Linda (as Jackie Giroux)
 Aarika Wells as Julia
 Howard Honig as Ron
 Frankie Hill as Delia
 Russ Courtney as Leon
 Jerry Jones as Gabby
 Leonard D'John as Mickey
 Peter Pan as Chinese Herbalist
 Jamie V. Arias as Tango Man
 Rosa M. Torres as Tango Woman
 Stan Kamber as Punk Rock Bartender
 Falling Idols as Punk Band

Home media
The film was released on videocassette in 1985 by Vestron Video. Afterwards, Anchor Bay released the film onto DVD in 2000. The DVD contained a commentary by director Norbert Meisel and stars Nancy Kwan and Robert Forster. Fun City Editions will release the film on Blu-ray in 2021 with a new 4K restoration from the original 35mm camera negative.

References

External links 
 
 
 

1985 films
Empire International Pictures films
Films about taxis
American films about revenge
Films scored by Jay Chattaway
1980s English-language films
1980s American films